Jansen Visconti is an American umpire in Major League Baseball who was hired to the full-time staff in 2020 and wears number 52.

See also

 List of Major League Baseball umpires

References

External links 
 Retrosheet

Living people
Major League Baseball umpires
Year of birth missing (living people)